Eliška Boubelová (born 8 April 1916) was a Czech swimmer. She competed in the women's 200 metre breaststroke at the 1936 Summer Olympics.

References

External links
 

1916 births
Possibly living people
Czech female swimmers
Olympic swimmers of Czechoslovakia
Swimmers at the 1936 Summer Olympics
Place of birth missing